60 Cycles is a 1965 Canadian short from the National Film Board of Canada directed and photographed by Jean-Claude Labrecque.

Synopsis
60 Cycles is a film about the 11th St-Laurent long-distance bicycle race covering 2,400 kilometres of Gaspé countryside in 12 days. With the curving, picturesque landscape as backdrop, you see here an event where the challenge seems more personal than competitive. 60 Cycles was the first to use a 1,000-mm lens in an opening shot that remains famous: a group of cyclists is shown riding towards the camera with the impression that they are not even moving due to the long focal length of the lens.

In 1966, Labrecque told Take One magazine, "I found I could go further in experimenting with the effects of various lenses on heat. For example, we found out how heat waves can be seen coming off the road on a hot day. We first noticed the effect approaching the camera way in the distance. With everything telescoped, it produced a unique effect. Notice how, on the right of the line of cyclists (they were on a straight road seven miles long), the telephone poles seem to be a narrow fence. In reality, there is a 180 feet between each pole.

"We used Eastmancolor and had three telephoto lenses (1,000, 600 and 300 mm) on Arriflex cameras with an Angenieux zoom 25–250. We had two operators, two assistants, one racing car driver and one business manager. In the end, we only used the sequence shot with the 1,000-mm lens. This was done so as not to break the rhythm, since the three sequences gave different speeds to the racers and varied the rhythm of the 'heat waves', which are so noticeable in the film."

Influence
George Lucas has stated that he was influenced by 60 Cycles when he directed his 1966 student film 1:42.08.

Awards
Canadian Film Award – Best Cinematography (colour); nominated for a BAFTA for Best Short Film.

References

External links
 (requires Adobe Flash)

1965 short films
National Film Board of Canada short films
National Film Board of Canada documentaries
Films directed by Jean-Claude Labrecque
Documentary films about cycling
Films shot in Quebec
Films produced by Jacques Bobet
Canadian short documentary films
1960s short documentary films
1960s French-language films
French-language Canadian films
1960s Canadian films
Cycle racing in Quebec